Bhilangna River is a Himalayan river in Uttarakhand, India, which is the major tributary of the Bhagirathi river, the source stream of the Ganges River of India. Bhilangana is a combination of  Bhil  and Ganga.

It meets its major tributary the  Bal Ganga at Ghansali (elevation ).

The Bal Ganga, whose headwaters are formed at the foot of Mount Kukhli Dhar (elevation ), itself has a minor tributary, the Dharam Ganga, which meets it at Thati Kathur (also Budha Kedar) at elevation 

The Khatling trek route passes alongside the Bhilangna, starting from the last point accessible by road, Ghuttu, until the glacier, which stands at 3700 metres. If one were to go further on the trail past the glacier, one could reach Kedarnath.

See also
Bhagirathi River
Ganges
Alaknanda River

References

External links
Uttarakhand State Tourism - Rafting

Rivers of Uttarakhand
Tributaries of the Ganges
Rivers of India